Thermothrix azorensis is a Gram-negative, facultatively chemolithoautotrophic, non-spore-forming, aerobic, thermophilic, sulfur-oxidizing bacterium of the genus Thermothrix, isolated from a hot spring on Sao Miguel Island in the Azores. T. azorensis uses thiosulfate, tetrathionate, hydrogen sulfide, and elemental sulfur for its sources of energy (chemolithoautotrophic).

References 

Burkholderiaceae
Bacteria described in 1996